Timahdite is a town in Ifrane Province, Fès-Meknès, Morocco. According to the 2004 census it has a population of 2507. Located at an altitude of 1800 metres, it lies in the heart of Middle Atlas Mountains, in an area with a harsh climate.

The local breed of Timahdite sheep is one of the major Moroccan sheep breeds.

Geography

Timahdite is located 30 kilometres south of the city of Azrou on the N13 national road commonly used by people crossing the massif of the Middle Atlas and High Atlas to reach Errachidia and the Sahara Desert. Five kilometres north of the city is the ski resort of Ifrane. The Sebou River, the second longest river in Morocco, has its source not far from the town in a river upstream known as the Wadi Guigou and is fed from melting snow and from springs. Twenty kilometres south of the town is Lake Aguelmame Sidi Ali within Khénifra Province at an altitude of 2100 metres. Timahdite has a very cold climate with  some of the lowest temperatures in Africa.  Significant snowfall in winter months often makes the N13 road in this region impassable for weeks. The surrounding mountains keep their snow until May.

References

Populated places in Ifrane Province